Dehkadeh or Deh Kadeh or Deh-e Kadeh may refer to:
 Dehkadeh-ye Taleqani, Alborz Province
 Dehkadeh, Kerman
 Dehkadeh, Khuzestan
 Dehkadeh-ye Towhid, Tehran Province
 Dehkadeh Olampik, Tehran Province